The 1935 Tulane Green Wave football team represented Tulane University as a member of the Southeastern Conference (SEC) during the 1935 college football season. Led by fourth-year head coach Ted Cox, the Green Wave played their home games at Tulane Stadium in New Orleans. Tulane finished the season with an overall record of 6–4 and a mark of 3–3 in conference play, tying for sixth place in the SEC.

Schedule

References

Tulane
Tulane Green Wave football seasons
Tulane Green Wave football